The Moreno Valley Mall at Towngate is a shopping mall located on the former site of the Riverside International Raceway in Moreno Valley, California.

Developed by Homart Development Company, the initial anchor stores in 1992 were Sears, J. C. Penney, May Company California, and Harris Department Stores and had 140 specialty stores.

In the early years competition for tenants divided prospects between competing developers. In September 1996 the City confirmed that lower than anticipated revenues would result in a shortfall estimated to extend the payback period of the $13 million infrastructure loan to an estimated 2026 with the loan peaking at $19.5 million. Also, the mall was then valued at $66 million, far less than its original valuation of $107 million.

Moreno Valley Mall directly contracts with the local Police Service as well as private security firm for security services.

In 2015, Sears Holdings spun off 235 of its properties, including the Sears at Moreno Valley Mall, into Sertiage Growth Properties.

International Growth Properties purchased Moreno Valley Mall in November 2017 for $63 million.

On November 7, 2019, it was announced that Sears would be closing this location a part of a plan to close 96 stores nationwide. The store closed on February 2, 2020.

Major anchors
Harkins Theatres
Macy's
J. C. Penney
Round1 Entertainment

Former anchors
Harris - Store converted into Gottschalks in 1999.
Gottschalks - Store closed in 2008 due to struggles before bankruptcy in 2009.
May Company - Store converted into Robinsons-May in 1993.
Robinsons-May - Store converted into Macy's in 2006.
Sears - Store closed due to company's struggle in February 2020.

References

External links

1992 establishments in California
Moreno Valley, California
Shopping malls established in 1992
Shopping malls in Riverside County, California